CD-43 was a C Type class escort ship (Kaibōkan) of the Imperial Japanese Navy during the Second World War. She was laid down by Mitsubishi Heavy Industries at their Kobe Shipyard on 10 April 1944, launched on 22 June 1944, and completed and commissioned on 31 July 1944. During the war CD-43 was mostly busy on escort duties.

On 12 January 1945, off Cape Paderan in the South China Sea, CD-43 was strafed by aircraft from the USS Lexington (CV-16), USS Hancock (CV-19) and USS Hornet (CV-12) which were then part of Vice Admiral John S. McCain, Sr.'s Task Force 38 that had entered the South China Sea to raid Japanese shipping. 29 of her crew were killed and the steering compartment flooded. being inoperable, the captain beached the ship on an uninhabited island and using its own munitions, destroyed the ship.

CD-43 was struck from the Navy List on 10 March 1945.

References

Additional sources

1944 ships
Ships built by Mitsubishi Heavy Industries
Type C escort ships
Maritime incidents in January 1945
World War II shipwrecks in the Sea of Japan